National figure skating championships for the 2021–22 season are scheduled to take place mainly from December 2021 to January 2022. They will be held to crown national champions and to serve as part of the selection process for international events, such as the 2022 ISU Championships and the 2022 Winter Olympics. Medals will be awarded in the disciplines of men's singles, women's singles, pairs, and ice dance. A few countries will choose to organize their national championships together with their neighbors; the results will subsequently be divided into national podiums.

Competitions 
Competition schedules are subject to change due to the ongoing global COVID-19 pandemic.

Key

Cancelled

Senior medalists

Senior men

Senior women

Senior pairs

Senior ice dance

Junior medalists

Junior men

Junior women

Junior pairs

Junior ice dance

References 

Nationals
Nationals
Figure skating national championships